Martin Schultz (or Shultz, Schulz) may refer to:

 Martin Schulz (born 1955), former president of the European Parliament
 Martin Schulz (paratriathlete), German triathlete
 Johan Martin Shultz (1740–1787), surgeon in the American Revolutionary War
 , Governor of Swedish Ingria 1681–82
 Martin Schultz House, a historic house in Pennsylvania
 Martin–Schultz scale, a scale for human eye color

See also 
 Mark Schultz (disambiguation)